Lord Duncan was launched in New Brunswick in 1798. She transferred to Britain circa 1799. A French privateer captured her in 1800 but the Royal Navy recaptured her. A second French privateer captured her in 1804 and took her into Guadeloupe.

Career
Lord Duncan first appeared in Lloyd's Register (LR) in the volume for 1799.

The French privateer Brave captured Lord Duncan, Lyon, master. Lord Duncan, Robert Lyon, master, was carrying a cargo of sugar, rum, coffee, and cotton, from Antigua to Glasgow. However, the cutter Viper recaptured Lord Duncan, which arrived at Falmouth. Captain Lyon on 7 July 1800 wrote a letter from Bordeaux. He also listed a number of other vessels that Brave had captured, including .

Fate
On 28 February 1804 Lord Duncan was on her way from London to St Vincents and in the latitude of Barbados when she encountered the French privateer Grand Decidé. The privateer took Lord Duncan into Guadeloupe.

Notes

Citations

References
 

1798 ships
Age of Sail merchant ships of England
Captured ships